Bohemia Visual Music (also referred to as "BVM" and "BVM TV") is an Internet broadcast music video service in the United States that was formerly a Television Broadcast Station Service.

History
The service began as Bohemia Afterdark in 1982 and operated in Phoenix, AZ but early history is unknown until 1990 when they moved to Portland, Oregon. In 1992 they began airing on KPDX Portland and then they move to KWBP in 1994. In 1995 they began airing on 22 Network One affiliates. In 1997 Network One shut down and the service moved to KOIN and in 2001, the service moved back to Phoenix, airing on KASW, then in 2002, moved to KPHO-TV. In 2003 they got their own station, KPHE-LP, at the time broadcasting on channel 19 in Mesa, Arizona, and changed their name to Bohemia Visual Music. KPHE moved to channel 44 in Phoenix in 2005. Bohemia Visual Music changed their name to 24-7 Videos for a few months from mid-2005 to early-2006, then reverted to Bohemia Visual Music.

In July 2006, KPHE replaced Bohemia Visual Music with Spanish-language programming, and BVM was without a broadcast outlet until September 2006, when they began broadcasting on KORS-CA digital subchannel 16.2 in Portland.

In March 2008, Bohemia Visual Music began broadcasting on KDOC-TV 56.3 in Los Angeles, California and KJKZ-LP 27 in Fresno, California, but by July, BVM was no longer airing on these channels.

On March 29, 2010, Bohemia Visual Music left KORS-CA from its digital signal to focus on Internet Broadcasting. Now KORS-CD, it carries only Home Shopping Network (HSN) and America One.

As of August 20, 2011, Bohemia Visual Music relaunched with a website as an internet broadcast.

Programming
Bohemia Visual Music featured a diverse mix of music video programming.

Former affiliates

Logos

Slogans
 Music Television, The Way It Should Be (2002-2010)
 It's About The Music (2003-2010)
 Your Music Channel (2008-2010)

References

External links
 Bohemia Visual Music official website
 Youtube: Bohemia Visual Music

Music video networks in the United States
Music of Portland, Oregon
Music of Phoenix, Arizona
Television channels and stations established in 1982
Television channels and stations disestablished in 2010
Defunct television networks in the United States